Amber Latvijas Balzams is the largest alcoholic beverage producer in the Baltic states headquartered in Riga. , it had a market share of about 50% in Latvia. The company has a long history as the beginning of it can be considered 1900 when Riga State Spirits Warehouse No.1 started operation as it later changed its name to Latvijas balzams in 1970 and eventually became a public joint stock company in 1997. Its flagship product is Riga Black Balsam which is a traditional Latvian herbal liqueur.

References 

Manufacturing companies based in Riga
Distilleries
Latvian brands
Latvian vodkas
Food and drink companies established in 1997
Food and drink companies of Latvia
Companies listed on Nasdaq Riga
Latvian companies established in 1997